Streblus pendulinus, commonly known as Hawai'i roughbush or aiai (Hawaiian language), is a species of flowering plant in the mulberry family, Moraceae, that is native to eastern Australia, Melanesia, Micronesia, and Polynesia.

References

External links

pendulinus
Trees of Papuasia
Trees of the Pacific
Flora of Norfolk Island
Flora of New South Wales
Flora of Queensland
Rosales of Australia
Trees of Australia